The following article presents a summary of the 1951 football (soccer) season in Brazil, which was the 50th season of competitive football in the country.

Torneio Rio-São Paulo

Final Standings

Championship playoff

Palmeiras declared as the Torneio Rio-São Paulo champions.

State championship champions

Brazilian clubs in international competitions

Brazil national team
The Brazil national football team did not play any matches in 1951.

References

 Brazilian competitions at RSSSF
 1947–1952 Brazil national team matches at RSSSF

 
Seasons in Brazilian football
Brazil